Josh King or Joshua King may refer to:

 Joshua King (footballer) (born 1992), Norwegian footballer
 Josh King (rugby league) (born 1995), Australian rugby league footballer
 Joshua King (1798–1857), 19th century University of Cambridge professor